The Tampa Street Circuit was a temporary street circuit located in Tampa, Florida, which hosted IMSA GT Championship races between 1989 and 1990.

Lap records

The fastest official race lap records at the Tampa Street Circuit are listed as:

References

Defunct motorsport venues in the United States
Motorsport venues in Florida
IMSA GT Championship circuits